Xató is a typical Catalan dish. It is a sauce made with almonds, hazelnuts, breadcrumbs, vinegar, garlic, olive oil, salt, and the nyora pepper. The sauce is often served with an endive salad prepared with anchovy, tuna and dried and salted cod (bacallà).

The "Xató Route" is formed by the following Catalan towns: Canyelles, Calafell, Cubelles, Cunit, El Vendrell, Sant Pere de Ribes, Sitges and Vilanova i la Geltrú. There is a recipe for each town on the 'Xató route'.

Catalonia 
The origin of xató lies in the world of wine. Once the wine was about to be tasted, a fundamental ceremony took place in the whole process that consisted of placing a small tap (l'aixetó) that allowed the wine to come out of the container. This moment marked the beginning of the new wine festival, a celebration that was accompanied by a meal made up of salty ingredients such as fish, which were found in the houses of local farmers and fishermen, served with leaves of the vegetable corresponding to the winter season and salad with a special sauce. This ritual meal that accompanied the ceremony of shaking the wine boot is the origin of the current xató.

In spite of everything, the paternity of this traditional dish in the Penedès and Garraf regions continues to be disputed. Currently, practically all the towns of Gran Panadés have their own variant of the recipe for this dish and the traditional xatonades have become popular in the region, which are popular gatherings in which the participants taste this dish.

Ambassador of Xató
1998-1999 : Ferran Adrià
1999-2000 : Xavier Mestres
2000-2001 : Carles Gaig 
2001-2002 : Jordi LP
2002-2003 : La Cubana
2003-2004 : Toni Albà 
2004-2005 : Rosa Andreu
2005-2006 : Pere Tàpies 
2006-2007 : Lax'n'busto
2007-2008 : Anna Barrachina
2008-2009 : Montserrat Estruch 
2009-2010 : Oriol Llavina

See also
Salsa Romesco, a Catalan nut and red pepper-based sauce
 List of almond dishes

External links

Receta, en español
Recipe, translated from Spanish
 Official 'Xató route' Site

Catalan cuisine
Sauces
Almond dishes
Vilanova i la Geltrú